The North West Parks Board is a governmental organisation responsible for the management of protected areas and public nature reserves in North West Province, South Africa.

The different reserves are scattered throughout the province, each with its unique features. Activities within the reserves are available for educational, recreation and enjoyment of both outdoor adventure enthusiasts and those who want a break away from the crowd.

With the exception of Madikwe Game Reserve, all the reserves are open to day visitors and no prior booking is necessary.

Accommodation range from rustic farm houses, tented camps, caravan and camping sites. In reserves where facilities are not provided, these are different privately owned accommodation either on the periphery of the reserves or in nearby towns.

Parks managed by North West Parks and Tourism Board 

 Barberspan Bird Sanctuary
 Bloemhof Dam Nature Reserve
 Borakalalo National Reserve
 Boskop Nature Reserve
 Botsalano Game Reserve
 Kgaswane Mountain Reserve
 Madikwe Game Reserve
 Mafikeng Game Reserve
 Molemane Eye Nature Reserve
 Molopo Game Reserve
 Pilanesberg National Park
 SA Lombard Nature Reserve
 Vaalkop Dam Nature Reserve
 Wolwespruit Dam Reserve

See also 
 South African National Parks
 Protected areas of South Africa

References

External links 
 North West Parks Board

Tourism agencies
 
Tourism in South Africa